John Caius or Kay, sometimes called the elder, (fl. 1480), was an English poet.

Kay was the English translator of the Siege of Rhodes, an account of the unsuccessful Ottoman assault on Rhodes in 1480. The original Latin text Obsidionis Rhodiæ urbis descriptio (1480) had been written by Gulielmus Caoursin, the vice-chancellor of the order of the knights of St John of Jerusalem and an eye witness to the siege. The English translation was printed c. 1481-84.

Kay dedicates his translation to Edward IV, as whose '' he describes himself. But the expression does not necessarily imply that the writer held any official position at court. The dedication also refers to time spent abroad in Italy, possibly studying, but beyond this details of his biography remain unclear and debated.

References

Year of birth missing
Year of death missing
15th-century English people
15th-century English writers
English male poets